Arabsat-1A was a Saudi Arabian communications satellite which was operated by Arab Satellite Communications Organization. It was used to provide communication services to the Arab States. It was constructed by Aérospatiale, based on the Spacebus 100 satellite bus, and carries two NATO E/F-band (IEEE S band) and 25 NATO G/H-Band (IEEE C band) transponders.

Arabsat-1A was launched by Arianespace using an Ariane 3 rocket flying from ELA-1 at Kourou. The launch took place at 23:22:00 UTC on 8 February 1985. It was the first Spacebus satellite to be launched. Immediately after launch, one of its solar panels failed to deploy, resulting in reduced performance. It was placed into a geosynchronous orbit at a longitude of 19.0° East. Following a series of gyroscope malfunctions, it was retired from active service, and remained operational as a backup. In September 1991, another problem developed with the spacecraft's attitude control system, and it began to drift eastward. It failed completely in March 1992.

See also

 1985 in spaceflight

References

Spacecraft launched in 1985
Derelict satellites orbiting Earth
Satellites using the Spacebus bus
Ariane commercial payloads
Satellites of Saudi Arabia
1985 in spaceflight
1985 in Saudi Arabia